Amir George is an American filmmaker, artist, and curator. He is best known for Black Radical Imagination an international touring experimental film program he co-founded with Erin Christovale. In November 2022 he became the Artistic Director of Kartemquin Films

Early life and career
Amir’s student film Sneaker Freak popped up on hip hop blogs in 2008, due to the short featuring an unreleased song by The Cool Kids. In 2011, he directed a short film The Mind of Delilah starring Thai Tyler, and The Twilite Tone. In 2017, he released a short film entitled Decadent Asylum.

Amir's films have screened at institutions and film festivals including Anthology Film Archives, Glasgow School of Art, Museum of Contemporary Art, Chicago, Ann Arbor Film Festival, Museum of Contemporary Art Detroit , Trinidad and Tobago Film Festival, BlackStar Film Festival, and Chicago Underground Film Festival, among others.

Amir has served as a film programmer for True/False Film Fest and Chicago International Film Festival.

Black Radical Imagination

Black Radical Imagination is an international touring film program founded by Amir George and Erin Christovale. The films featured contextualized afrofuturist ideas through contemporary experimental films created by Black filmmakers. The first consecutive screenings took place in 2013 in Los Angeles, New York, and Chicago between Feb-May. In June that year, Black Radical Imagination was invited to screen at Mickalene Thomas’s Art Bar Installation, Better Days in Basel, Switzerland. The Black Radical Imagination curated film programs have screened in art and cultural institutions including MoMA PS1, MOCA, Museo Taller Jose Clemente Orozco, Schomburg Center for Research in Black Culture, Institute of Contemporary Arts and Museum of Contemporary Art, Chicago.

Filmography

References

External links 

 Amir George

Film curators
American film directors
Living people
Year of birth missing (living people)